Girls Who Like Boys Who Like Boys is an American reality television series that premiered on December 7, 2010, on the Sundance Channel. The series chronicles the lives of four gay men and their female best friends. Season 2, which saw the show relocating to Nashville, Tennessee, premiered November 18, 2011.

Cast

Season 1
 Elisa and David - Elisa Casas owns a vintage clothing store, Chelsea Girl, in SoHo and David Munk manages it. They met while living across the hall from each other in the Weinstein dormitory at New York University.
 Sarah and Joel - Sarah Rose is a travel writer and the author of For All the Tea in China: How England Stole the World's Favorite Drink and Changed History. Joel Derfner is the author of two books, Gay Haiku and Swish: My Quest to Become the Gayest Person Ever and What Ended Up Happening Instead. He also composes musicals.
 Rosebud and Sahil - Rosebud Baker is an actress. She and Sahil Farooqi met in college in Virginia. As of the series premiere, Sahil had not come out to his family.
 Crystal and Nathan - Crystal McCrary and Nathan Hale Williams operate a film and television production company. Crystal is the mother of NBA point guard Cole Anthony and, with Rita Ewing, is the co-author of the novel Homecourt Advantage.

Season 2
 Tenisha and Jared - Tenisha Jackson is a children's book author and Jared Allman is an aspiring actor.
 Kristin and Peter - Kristin Sabata is a school psychologist whose husband is deployed in Afghanistan. Peter Depp is a stand-up comedian with three children from a previous marriage to a woman.
 Sherrié and Shane - Sherrié Austin, a former child actress, is a singer/songwriter determined to make a return to performing after years of songwriting for other artists. Shane Stevens is also a songwriter and aspiring singer.
 Olivia and Brent - Olivia McCarthy is a restaurateur and publishes a regional magazine. Brent Oscar Young is an event planner and publicist.

Episodes

Season 1 (2010)

Season 2 (2011-12)

Reception
Ellen Gray of The Philadelphia Daily News found Girls to be similar in tone to the series Will & Grace and pondered whether a reality version of that show was necessary. Despite that, the News found the lack of "manufactured" drama a positive change from other similar reality programs. The New York Daily News'''s Richard Huff, also comparing Girls Who Like Boys Who Like Boys to the "groundbreaking" Will & Grace, labels Girls Who Like Boys Who Like Boys "mind-breaking". It has moments, sure, but never enough to make it memorable or a winner." The lack of "reality-show trappings" like "table flipping" and "hair-extension pulling", he writes, means that the series needs "some humor, drama and good storytelling" and Girls Who Like Boys Who Like Boys lacks these qualities. Hank Stuever of The Washington Post cites a "curiously sad tone" that pervades Girls Who Like Boys Who Like Boys. "The show often seems at cross-purposes," he continues, "as if the producers had a clear idea of what sort of peppy project they wanted to film and then picked the wrong people to follow around."

Troy Patterson of Slate.com calls the series "intriguingly ridiculous". Girls Who Like Boys Who Like Boys, he writes, seeks to be a serious show but in trying to be serious it "betrays its core triviality". Brent Hartinger of the gay-interest website TheBacklot.com writes that it is "a smart, watchable show". Acknowledging the Will & Grace''-like premise, Hartinger notes that the series quickly deals with the similarities and "becomes about four very specific pairings, each of which is interesting and unique in its own way. Better still, none of the relationships is perfect, and only one is what might you think of when you think of this type of relationship". Joel Derfner, a co-star of season one of the show, has publicly criticized the show's producers for their editing and manipulation of statements and sentiments, which sometimes ended up on air as the opposite of fact.

References

External links
 

2010 American television series debuts
2012 American television series endings
English-language television shows
2010s American LGBT-related television series
2010s American reality television series
Gay-related television shows
Television shows set in New York City
Sundance TV original programming
American LGBT-related reality television series
2010s LGBT-related reality television series